Hinduism is a minority religion in Spain.

History
Starting in the early 20th century, Sindhis came to the British colony of Gibraltar looking for greater financial opportunity. From there they went to Ceuta and Melilla, Spanish territories in North Africa, eventually branching out to other cities and islands. Sindhi traders and shopkeepers thrived in the freeports of the Spanish Canary Islands of Gran Canaria and Tenerife following the imposition of import and foreign exchange restrictions in Spain after World War-II. They conducted a brisk trade with the North African continent from Las Palmas. When Ceuta and Melilla, were also declared as free ports, Indian businessmen set up trading houses and retail shops catering to the tourist trade.

Community
There are about 40,000-50,000 Hindus in Spain, about 25,000  from India, 5,000 from Eastern Europe and Latin America and 10,000 Spanish. There are also small communities of Hindus from Nepal (around 200) and Bangladesh (around 500). The Indian community number around 30,000, or about 0.04% of the population.

Catalonia
There are 27 Hindu temples or centres in Catalonia as of 2014, 14 of which are situated in the province of Barcelona. The religion is mostly represented by Indian immigrants, though there is also a significant number of Catalan converts. Indeed, the vast majority of Hindu temples hold their services in Catalan or Spanish language. Hindus in Catalonia follow a variety of traditions of worship and thought, with multiple groups identifying with specific gurus.

Canary Islands 
Hindus constitute 0.5% of the population of Spain overseas territory of the Canary Islands. About half of the Hindus in Spain live in the Canary Islands. Tenerife is one of the few places in Europe where Ganesh Chaturthi is publicly celebrated.

Melilla
Hinduism is practised by a minority of people in Spain overseas territory of Melilla. When Melilla became a free port at the end of the 19th century, many Indians came to the city to set up trade. The Hindu Oratory on Calle Castelar is the community's religious and cultural focal point. However, due to the migration for better jobs, the Hindu community now counts only 100 members.

Ceuta

There is a small number of around 500 Hindus living in Spain overseas territory of Ceuta.
Hindus have lived in Ceuta since 1893, as merchants and as people who are linked to Gibraltar. They established the Bazar el Indio, and later settled in Ceuta with families. More Hindus arrived in Ceuta was in and after 1947. In 1948, the Hindu Merchants' Association was established, which was the first Hindu association in Spain. In 1997 the name of the organization was changed to Comunidad Hindu de Ceuta. The first Hindu temple of Ceuta was built in 2007 according to the project of Andrés Ruíz Manrique, Hicham Abselam and Nordin Abselam, with Francisco Morales  thanks to the impetus of Juan Carlos Ramchandani, it was inaugurated on October 22, 2007. There is also a Hindu crematorium of Ceuta completed in 2006. Almost all of Ceuta's Hindus are of Sindhi origin.

Hindu Temples in Spain
There are also about 40 Hindu temples/worship-places in Spain. The first Hindu temple in Ceuta city was completed in 2007. There are ISKCON Krishna Temples in Barcelona, Madrid, Malaga, Tenerife and Brihuega along with a Krishna restaurant in Barcelona.

Hindu Associations in Spain

Federación Hindú de España (FHE)
FHE was formed in 2017. Its goals include uniting Hindus and promoting and defending Hinduism. It also seeks to challenge and correct academic misrepresentation of Hinduism.

See also
 Hinduism in Gibraltar
 Gibraltar Hindu Temple
 Hinduism in Portugal
Hinduism in Switzerland

References

External links
Hindu Temple in Valencia, Spain
IRF 2006, Spain
New Temple Rises in CEUTA, Spain
Indian/ Hindu Associations in Spain
Overseas Indian Population 2001 including Spain

Spain
Spain
Religion in Spain